Alan J. Shalleck (November 14, 1929 – February 6, 2006) was an American writer and producer for children's programming on television, most known for his work on later Curious George books and the 1980s television shorts.

Shalleck studied drama at Syracuse University in Syracuse, New York and went to work for CBS in the 1950s, eventually becoming an associate producer on the children's television series Winky Dink and You. In the early sixties he moved to Montreal where he produced "Like Young", at CFCF-TV, a highly successful teen music/dance show starring Jim McKenna that was eventually picked up and syndicated by Dick Clark Productions. Following his years at CBS, and CFCF-TV Shalleck was a producer at The Network for Continuing Medical Education and then formed his own production company (AJ Shalleck Productions) and produced a number of low-budget children's animated films and television episodes.

In 1977, he approached Margret Rey about producing a television series based on Curious George, which led to the 1980 television show. Shalleck and Rey wrote more than 100 short episodes for the series. In addition, they collaborated on a number of children's books and audiobooks. (Some of these books list Rey as the author and Shalleck as the editor, while others reverse the credits.)

In his retirement, Shalleck created the company "Reading By GRAMPS" and visited local elementary schools, bookstores, and other events to read books to children and promote literacy. However, he also experienced financial problems and was forced to supplement his income with part-time jobs. He most recently worked as a bookseller for Borders Books in Boynton Beach, Florida.

On February 7, 2006, a few days before the theatrical release of a Curious George animated motion picture, Shalleck's body was discovered, partially hidden, at his home in Boynton Beach, Florida, a victim of a robbery/homicide. His attackers were tracked down using the victim's phone records. They confessed to the crime.

On October 19, 2007, one of Shalleck's murderers, 31-year-old Rex Ditto, was sentenced to life in prison and is not eligible for parole. Ditto's co-defendant, Vincent Puglisi, was convicted of first-degree murder and robbery with a deadly weapon on June 24, 2008. He was sentenced in July 2008 to life in prison and is also not eligible for parole.

References 

American children's writers
Television producers from New York (state)
1929 births
2006 deaths
2006 murders in the United States
American murder victims
Syracuse University alumni
Deaths by stabbing in Florida
People murdered in Florida
Male murder victims
People from Boynton Beach, Florida
Curious George
Television producers from Florida